The 2003 season in Swedish football started in January 2003 and ended in December 2003.

Honours

Official titles

Competitions

Promotions, relegations and qualifications

Promotions

Relegations

International qualifications

Domestic results

Allsvenskan

2003 Allsvenskan qualification play-off

Superettan

2003 Svenska Cupen 
Quarter-finals

Semi-finals

Final

National team results

References 
Print

Online

 
Seasons in Swedish football